Taste of Life is a Taiwanese Hokkien television drama that began airing on SET Taiwan in Taiwan on 28 July 2015, from Mondays to Fridays.

Synopsis
Chu-Tsai, Chao and his wife have five children. Devoted all his life into developing soy sauce products, Chu-Tsai very much hopes that one of his kids can follow his footsteps and take over his business, but he also respects their own passions and aspirations. Because of their father's invention dream, the Chao brother's lives are about to change...

Cast
 Wang Shih-hsien as Zhao Xinda
 Athena Lee Yen as Chen Yixuan and Jiang Jiang hao
 Eric Huang as Zhao Yingkai
 Angel Han as Yang Zixin
 Vicky Ceng as Zhou Xiaojing
 Franco Chiang as Jiang Da Tong
 Carolyn Chen as Jiang Qian Qian
 Lung Shao-hua as King
 Miao Ke-li as Kayla (cameo)
 Frankie Huang as Hsien Ge (cameo)
Grace Lin as Yan Qiao Ling
Angus Hiseh as Gao Ke Wei
Cocco Wu as An Chen Xi and Chen Yi Mei
Norman Chen as Li Jia Liang and Zhuge Yu
Chunya Chao as Luo Shou Zhen
James Chen as Li Jia Ming
Margaret Wang as Wang Le Le 
Ruby Lin as Gao Yuan Yuan
Nic Chang as Shi Da Lin
Elissa Liao as Lai Tian Jie 
Joyce Yu as Weng Mei Ji and Lin Qiu Ping
Serene Wang as Liu Ya Lin
Leo Ting as Huang Wen Chang

Broadcast

International broadcast

Singapore broadcast
The series was broadcast on weekdays from 4.30pm to 5.30 pm due to local broadcast laws prohibiting radio or television broadcasts in Chinese dialects, the show was dubbed into Mandarin when it aired on Singapore's MediaCorp Channel 8, thus making it the first channel to broadcast the show in Mandarin.

Repeat Telecast (2019)
It repeated its run from Tuesday - Saturday from 4.00am to 6.00am, succeeding Mom's House.
From 12 Jun 2020, it air from 4.00am to 5.00am, airing the previous weekday episode.

References

External links
Taste of Life Website 

Sanlih E-Television original programming
Taiwanese drama television series
2015 Taiwanese television series debuts
Hokkien-language television shows